Andrew James Parker (born September 8, 1961) is a former professional American football tight end in the National Football League. He played seven seasons for the Los Angeles Raiders (1984–1988, 1990) and the San Diego Chargers (1989).  An effective short yardage and goal line blocking specialist.  Voted by his pears as special teams captain in 87' and 88'.

References

1961 births
Living people
People from Redlands, California
Players of American football from California
American football tight ends
Utah Utes football players
Los Angeles Raiders players
San Diego Chargers players
Sportspeople from San Bernardino County, California